Guyanemidae is a family of nematodes belonging to the order Rhabditida.

Genera:
 Guyanema Petter, 1975
 Histodytes Aragort, Alvarez, Iglesias, Leiro & Sanmartin, 2002
 Ichthyofilaria Yamaguti, 1935
 Ichthyofilaroides Moravec & Justine, 2020
 Moravecia Ribu & Lester, 2004
 Pseudodelphis Adamson & Roth, 1990
 Travassosnema Moreira & de Oliveira, 1992

References

Nematodes